The Church of Jesus the Divine Worker (Gesù Divin Lavoratore) is a titular church in Rome, in the Portuense district, on Via Oderisi da Gubbio.

History
The first stone of the building, designed by architect Raffaele Fagnoni, was laid March 24, 1955; May 15, 1960 was consecrated by Cardinal Clemente Micara. The dedication to Jesus worker was commissioned by the popes themselves as a sign of the Church's presence in the world of work.
The church is home parish, established March 12, 1955 with the decree "Paterna solicitude"; in 1969 Paul VI awarded her the title of cardinal of "Jesus Divine Worker".  Christoph Schönborn, OP is the incumbent cardinal-protector since 1998.

Description
It is circular in shape, and is characterized by the high bell tower, also in a cylindrical shape. Outside it is red brick. Inside is the chancel floor, a crucifix over a background of multicolored tiles as well as a ceiling of reinforced concrete beams.

Cardinal Priest
Pope Paul VI established it as titular church on 30 April 1969.

Paul Yü Pin 30 April 1969 appointed-16 August 1978 died
Joseph Louis Bernardin 2 February 1983 appointed-14 November 1996 died
Christoph Schönborn, OP 21 February 1998 appointed-present

References
Pope Paul VI established it as titular Church

External links
Gesù Divin Lavoratore

Titular churches
Rome Q. XI Portuense
Roman Catholic churches completed in 1960
20th-century Roman Catholic church buildings in Italy